Lupe Fiasco's The Cool (commonly referred as The Cool) is the second studio album by American rapper Lupe Fiasco. It was released on December 18, 2007, by 1st & 15th Entertainment and Atlantic Records. Recording sessions took place during 2006 to 2007, with Lupe Fiasco himself, alongside Charles Patton (Chilly) serving as the records executive producers. A concept album, The Cool was based upon the song and a title character from his debut album, Food & Liquor (2006). The album features guest appearances from Gemini, Snoop Dogg and Matthew Santos, while the production was provided by Patrick Stump, Soundtrakk and Unkle, among others.

The album debuted at number 15 on the US Billboard 200, selling 143,407 copies in its first week. The album debuted as the number-one rap record and remained for 9 weeks. As of 2022 the album has been  certified platinum by the Recording Industry Association of America (RIAA). At the 2009 Grammy Awards, the album was nominated for the Best Rap Album.

Background 
While Fiasco was recording his second album, his father died of type II diabetes, his good friend Stack Bundles died, and his business partner and mentor—Charles "Chilly" Patton—was sentenced to 44 years in prison. When asked about the album's dark side, Fiasco replied:

Lupe Fiasco's The Cool expands on the story with Fiasco telling on the track, called "The Cool" from his debut album. Fiasco introduces the characters the Streets and the Game. The album tells the story of the little boy from "He Say, She Say" who grew up without a father, and the people that step in to raise him are the Streets and the Game, with The Streets playing his female love interest and The Game his father. Speaking on the concept Fiasco said:

Fiasco also stated that there are plans to spin The Cool into a horror-themed radio program, and a comic book. The album was also personalized into a promotion in the form of a skateboard design contest, hosted by imeem, which was won by Sluglife, the show name for designer/artist Lawrence Ervin.

Recording 
In an interview with MTV News, Fiasco explained how he planned to record The Cool:

Reception

Commercial performance 
The album debuted at number 15 on the Billboard 200, selling 143,407 copies in its first week in the United States. In its second week, the album rose to number 14 on the US Billboard 200. In the United Kingdom, the album debuted at number 7, due to the success of his first single, "Superstar" featuring Matthew Santos. That single reached into the top five on these singles charts. The album was certified gold in April 2008 & certified platinum in October 2022 by the Recording Industry Association of America for the shipment of 1,000,000 copies in the United States.

Critical response 

Lupe Fiasco's The Cool received positive reviews from music critics. At Metacritic, which assigns a normalized rating out of 100 to reviews from mainstream critics, the album received an average score of 77, based on 30 reviews. Entertainment Weekly said "Sonically, he's got the same kind of gratifying ADHD going on. Some tracks, like 'Paris, Tokyo,' contrast his Twista-style rapid-fire delivery with a lazy rhythm that's close to smooth jazz which can be compared to A Tribe Called Quest. 'Hello/Goodbye,' at the other extreme, has U.K. electro outfit Unkle providing a tense rock feel." The New York Times, hailing the album as "one of the year’s best hip-hop albums," added that "The songs only grow more urgent as Lupe Fiasco expands his sociopolitical perspective. 'Intruder Alert' starts as a wary love song and broadens its topic to immigration. 'Little Weapon,' produced by Patrick Stump of Fall Out Boy, looks at children with guns, from child soldiers in Africa to high school shooters. AllMusic said, "He is one of the most clever artists around, and as far as telling stories with rhymes goes, he's way up there, best exemplified by 'Hip-Hop Saved My Life' (a gripping story about a struggling rapper, based on the story of Slim Thug) and 'Gotta Eat' (where Lupe's inspiration for metaphors is a cheeseburger, yet it is no more corny than Main Source's classic 'Just a Friendly Game of Baseball')."

In a less enthusiastic review for The Guardian, Alexis Petridis felt that Fiasco indulges occasionally in "sanctimonious moralising" on what is an otherwise successful album. Entertainment Weekly named The Cool the 10th best album of 2007 in their year-end list.

Track listing 

Sample Credits
 "Go Go Gadget Flow" interpolates a line from "Don't Get it Twisted Freestyle" by Lupe Fiasco.
 "The Coolest" samples "Let the Drums Speak" performed by The Fatback Band.
 "Paris, Tokyo" samples "San Juan Sunset" performed by Eumir Deodato; and interpolates a line from "Ain't No Fun (If the Homies Can't Have None)" performed by Snoop Dogg featuring Nate Dogg, Kurupt and Warren G.
 "Gold Watch" samples "Do Whatever Turns You on Part. II" performed by The Prepositions.
 "Streets on Fire" samples "Amen, Brother" performed by The Winstons.
 "Little Weapon" samples "De Profundis" performed by Arvo Pärt; and interpolates a line from "Heat Under The Babyseat" by Fiasco.
 "Dumb It Down" samples "Ignorant Shit" by Fiasco.
 "Hello / Goodbye (Uncool)" samples "Chemistry" performed by Unkle.
 "The Die" samples "The Cool" by Fiasco; and "Damn Your Eyes" written by Stephen Bogard and Barbara Wyrick.

Personnel 
Information taken from Allmusic.

 Chris Allen – programming, digital editing, mixing
 Veronica Alvericci – marketing
 Craig Bauer– mixing
 James Book – bass, programming, digital editing
 Derrick "Drop" Braxton – producer
 Chris "Cosmic" Paultre – producer
 Jeff Breakey – digital editing, assistant
 Nathan Cabrera– art direction, design
 Pablo Clements – programming, background vocals, digital editing
 Lionel Deluy – photography
 Lupe Fiasco – producer, executive producer, vocal producer
 Richard File – organ, piano, programming, digital editing, synthesizer strings
 Chris Gehringer – mastering

 Jesse Gladstone – assistant
 Chris Goss – guitar, producer
 Josh Homme – guitar
 Darrale Jones – executive producer
 James Lavelle – background vocals
 Deborah Mannis-Gardner – sample clearance
 Andrew Painter – photography
 Krish Lingala – theremin, background vocals, guitar
 Dave Pensado – enhanced recording
 Brian Ranney – package production
 John Regan – layout design
 Jason Salvador – management
 Livia Tortella – marketing
 "You Can Ask" Giz – mixing

Charts

Weekly charts

Year-end charts

Release history

Certifications

References

External links 
 Lupe Fiasco's The Cool at Metacritic

2007 albums
Albums produced by Al Shux
Albums produced by Lupe Fiasco
Atlantic Records albums
Concept albums
Lupe Fiasco albums